Ormondroyd is a surname. Notable people with the surname include:

Edward Ormondroyd (born 1925), American writer
Ian Ormondroyd (born 1964), English footballer
Jack Ormondroyd (born 1991), rugby league footballer 
Danny Ormondroyd, lead character in the fictional film Brassed Off